The Departmental Council of Aisne is the deliberative assembly of the Aisne department in the region of Hauts-de-France. It consists of 42 members (general councilors) from 21 cantons.

The President of the General Council is Nicolas Fricoteaux.

Vice-Presidents 
The President of the Departmental Council is assisted by 12 vice-presidents chosen from among the departmental advisers. Each of them has a delegation of authority.

See also 

 Aisne
 Departmental councils of France

References 

Aisne
Aisne